Hilarolea incensa is a species of beetle in the family Cerambycidae, and the only species in the genus Hilarolea. It was described by Perty in 1832.

References

Hemilophini
Beetles described in 1832